Chorozinho is a municipality in the state of Ceará in the Northeast region of Brazil.

See also
List of municipalities in Ceará

References

https://www.citypopulation.de/php/brazil-regiaonordeste-admin.php?adm2id=2303956

Municipalities in Ceará